Barati is a 1954 Bollywood comedy film directed by J.K. Nanda. It stars Darpan, Chand Usmani, Johnny Walker, Om Prakash in pivotal roles. Darpan, a leading Pakistani actor, performed the lead role opposite Chand Usmani.

Cast
 Darpan
 Chand Usmani
 Johnny Walker
 Om Prakash

Soundtrack

References

External links
 

1954 films
Films scored by Roshan
1950s Hindi-language films
Indian comedy films
1954 comedy films
Indian black-and-white films